is the name of two post stations in Japan during the Edo period.
Fushimi-juku (Tōkaidō) was the fifty-fourth station on the Tōkaidō and the first station of the Ōsaka Kaidō
Fushimi-juku (Nakasendō) was the fiftieth station on the Nakasendō